Sin miedo a la verdad (English: No Fear of Truth) is a Mexican television series that premiered on 8 October 2018 on Las Estrellas. The series is produced by Rubén Galindo for Televisa and stars Alex Perea. The first season consists of 21 episodes.

The series revolves around Manu, an urban hero, who has a vlog that he uses anonymously, under the pseudonym "Gus", with which he identifies himself to protect those who have been victims of various kinds of injustice.

Seasons

Ya no estás solo (2018) 

Manu is an introverted man with special abilities, not only to repair cell phones, but to violate systems and passwords. Thanks to Doña Cata, his mentor, he has managed to survive hidden from a cruel past that still haunts him, leaving a terrible shadow in his soul and marking on his face. Manu works in the Plaza de la Computación, where they repair, adjust and get any kind of electronic devices and the only way Manu has to deal with the pain his past causes him is, helping others, so that through his vlog "Sin miedo a la verdad", he will be who anonymously protects those who have been victims of some injustice. As Manu goes about solving cases, he is persecuted by devil policeman Horacio, a corrupt cop, main perpetrator and responsible for the murder of Manu and Estefani's father, who wants to take revenge on Manu for killing his rapist brother and dirty cop.

Despierta (2019) 

After being in a coma for three months and after discovering that his sister Estéfani is alive and is "El Chaka", Manu wakes up and realizes that he has a bullet in his head. Manu tries to recover, when he learns that Bere left him and his vlog "Sin miedo a la verdad" has been hacked by someone who charges in exchange for helping people. Manu will have to flee from an increasingly powerful mafia cop  Horacio, look for his sister, find the truth behind the disappearance of Bere and discover the secret that Lety hides, who will continue trying to recover his love. Doña Cata, as always, will remain his unconditional ally, along with Chicho and Genaro.

Cast 
 Alex Perea as Manuel "Manu" Montero
 Dacia González as Catalina Gómez
 Tania Niebla as Berenice Hidalgo
 Ligia Uriarte as Lety
 Fermín Martínez as Horacio
 Israel Islas as Isidro
 Paola Miguel as María José Hidalgo
 Arturo Nahum as Alberto Gómez "Pila"
 Carlos Barragán as Cuauhtémoc Sánchez "El Bolillo"
 Ana Cristina Rubio as Estefani Montero
 Catalina López as Amanda
 Víctor Cerveira as Chicho
 Eugenio Montessoro as Alfredo Alonso
 Jackie Sauza as Andrea Loera (season 2–present)

Production 
On 4 November 2018, Televisa renewed the series for a second season. Filming of the second season began on 8 March 2019.

On 16 January 2020, two actors, Jorge Navarro Sánchez and Luis Gerardo Rivera, died after falling from a bridge during filming near Mexico City.

Ratings 
 

| link2             = List of No Fear of Truth episodes#Season 2: Despierta (2019)
| episodes2         = 24
| start2            = 
| end2              = 
| startrating2      = 3.0
| endrating2        = 3.3
| viewers2          = |2}} 

| link3             = List of No Fear of Truth episodes#Season 3: Es momento de resurgir (2020)
| episodes3         = 35
| start3            = 
| end3              = 
| startrating3      = 3.2
| endrating3        = 3.6
| viewers3          = |2}} 
}}

Awards and nominations

References

External links 
 

Mexican drama television series
2018 Mexican television series debuts
Las Estrellas original programming
Crime thriller television series
Television series by Televisa
Spanish-language television shows